Mo Joong-kyung (born 23 August 1971) is a professional golfer from South Korea who currently plays on the Asian Tour, where he has won twice.

Early life
Mo was born in Seoul and turned professional in 1995.

Professional career
After turning professional in 1995, Mo decided to stay and play mainly in South Korea to be close to his family. He has won five events on the Korean Tour, with his best year coming in 2004, which was the first year he earned six figures in season-long earnings.

Mo has also had some success on the Asian Tour. He won the 1996 Guam Open by three strokes over three players. In 1997 he finished a distant runner-up to Tiger Woods at the Asian Honda Classic. He maintained full-time status for many years afterwards but would not win again until the 2008 Singha Thailand PGA Championship. He defeated seasoned campaigners Juvic Pagunsan and hometown favorite Prayad Marksaeng down the stretch giving him the biggest victory of his career. He credited the victory to his hard work and self-belief in Chiang Rai. Later in the year he recorded a top-10 at the Volvo Masters of Asia. Overall 2008 would be his most successful year on the Asian Tour.

Mo represented Asia in 2005 in the Dynasty Cup where he and his Asian team were victorious.

Personal life
Mo currently resides in his place of birth Seoul with his wife and one child.

Professional wins (7)

Asian Tour wins (2)

Asian Tour playoff record (0–1)

Korean Tour wins (5)

Team appearances
Alfred Dunhill Cup (representing South Korea): 1997
Dynasty Cup (representing Asia): 2005 (winners)

References

External links

South Korean male golfers
Asian Tour golfers
1971 births
Living people